Chick Corea Featuring Lionel Hampton is an album first released in 1980 by American jazz pianist Chick Corea. The album contains three songs from 1971 additionally featuring Dave Holland on bass, Jack DeJohnette on drums, Hubert Laws on flute and Woody Shaw on trumpet., but apparently not vibraphonist Lionel Hampton. There is a fourth song (Passion Dance), recorded in a different environment from Lionel Hampton with a different trio, not including Chick Corea. So actually there is no song where Chick and Lionel play together.

Track listing 
Side one
 "Converge" – 8:05
 "This" – 12:46

Side two
 "Song of Wind" – 6:46
 "Passion Dance" – 10:00

Personnel 
 Chick Corea – piano
 Dave Holland – bass
 Jack DeJohnette – drums
 Hubert Laws – flute
 Woody Shaw – trumpet
 Lionel Hampton – vibraphone

References 

1980 albums
Chick Corea albums
Lionel Hampton albums